The 2011-2012 Welsh League Cup is the 20th season of the Welsh League Cup, which was established in 1992.

First round

First leg

Source: welsh-premier.com

Second leg

Source: welsh-premier.com

Second round

First leg

Source: welsh-premier.com

Second leg

Source: welsh-premier.com

Semifinals

First leg

Second leg

Final

External links
Official League Cup Website
 Welsh-Premier.com Loosemores League Cup
Loosemores Solicitors Official Website
Results

Welsh League Cup seasons
League Cup
Wales